The 2018 UNAF U-17 Tournament is the 15th edition of the UNAF U-17 Tournament. The tournament took place in Tunisia from 20 to 28 August 2018. This edition serve as a qualification for the Africa U-17 Cup of Nations, the winner will qualify for the 2019 Africa U-17 Cup of Nations held in Tanzania.

Participants

 (hosts)

 (withdrawn)

Venues
Stade Mustapha Ben Jannet, Monastir
Stade Olympique de Sousse, Sousse

Match officials
The following referees were chosen for the 2018 UNAF U-17 Tournament.

Referees

 Nabil Boukhalfa
 Ahmed El-Ghandour
 Amin Mohamed Omar
 Ayman Al-Sharif
 Samir Guezzaz
 Haythem Guirat

Assistant referees

 Mohamed Serradji
 Samir Jamal Saad
 Ali Tawfiq Taleb
 Ibrahim Boukouz
 Mustapha Akerkad
 Khalil Hassani

Squads

Tournament

All times are local, CET (UTC+1).

Goalscorers
3 goals

 Riad Rahmoune
 Tawfik Bentayeb

2 goals

 Bilal Ouchraf

1 goal

 Nabil Benali
 Belkacem Bouzida
 Ibrahim Al-Mesrati
 Akram Nakach
 Zakaria Ghilane
 Mehdi Ben Amira

References

2018 in African football
2018
2018
2018–19 in Algerian football
2018–19 in Moroccan football
2018–19 in Tunisian football
2018–19 in Libyan football
August 2018 sports events in Africa